Firecracker is the second album by The Wailin' Jennys.

The album was rated the #2 folk album of 2006 in North America by total airplay, and the #1 Canadian album.  The initial track, "The Devil's Paintbrush Road" by Annabelle Chvostek, was rated the #1 Canadian song for 2006 by total airplay.

The album was nominated for the 2007 Juno Award for "Roots and Traditional Album of the Year by a Group" and for "Contemporary Folk Album of the Year" by the North American Folk Alliance.

Track listing
"The Devil's Paintbrush Road" (Annabelle Chvostek)
"Glory Bound" (Ruth Moody)
"Begin" (Nicky Mehta)
"Things That You Know" (Ruth Moody)
"Swallow" (Annabelle Chvostek)
"Starlight" (Nicky Mehta)
"Apocalypse Lullaby" (Annabelle Chvostek)
"This Heart of Mine" (Ruth Moody)
"Long Time Traveller" (Traditional) (Composed as the hymn tune "White" by Edmund Dumas)
"Avila" (Nicky Mehta)
"Some Good Thing" (Nicky Mehta)
"Prairie Town" (Ruth Moody)
"Firecracker" (Annabelle Chvostek)

References

2006 albums
The Wailin' Jennys albums
Festival Distribution albums